Parnips is a genus of the family Figitidae, order Hymenoptera.

References

External links 
 SEM images

Hymenoptera genera